Zamia monticola is a species of plant in the family Zamiaceae. It is endemic to Guatemala.  It is threatened by habitat loss.

References

monticola
Endemic flora of Guatemala
Critically endangered flora of North America
Taxonomy articles created by Polbot